William Wilcox Tanner (1851–1938) was a New Zealand politician of the Liberal Party. In 1905 he was associated with the New Liberal Party group.

Early life

William Tanner was born in Moulton, Northamptonshire, England, in 1851. In 1877 he married a daughter of Mr. J. Browett of London. They came to New Zealand in 1879 on the Waitara. He worked as a boot maker in both England and New Zealand.

Political career

William Tanner represented the Christchurch seats of Heathcote from 1890 to 1893 and then Avon from 1893 to 1908, when he was defeated.

Among the radical policies that Tanner approved of were-the nationalisation of land, periodic revaluation of Crown leaseholds, and the establishment of a state bank.

He was a member of the Woolston Municipal Council (1893–1900), Canterbury Hospital Board (1911–14), and Secretary to the Bootmakers' Union of Christchurch. Tanner was considered to be "the first Labour candidate" to be elected to the New Zealand House of Representatives in 1890 when he was successful in the Heathcote electorate.
 
Tanner was described by the Lyttelton Times in 1902 as: "Methodical, studious, always ready to refer to statistics, records and a terror for detail" (Lyttelton Times, 18 October 1902, p. 4). The Christchurch Press said of him: "Nice voice, speaks slowly with a precision almost painful...Hard-working, intelligent, industrious and no reason to doubt his honesty".

Family

Tanner died in 1938. His son Walter Tanner was the second Chief Censor of Films in New Zealand.

References

The New Liberal Party 1905 by G.F. Witcher (1966, MA(Hons) Thesis-University of Canterbury, Christchurch)

|-

|-

1851 births
1938 deaths
New Zealand Liberal Party MPs
Independent MPs of New Zealand
Local politicians in New Zealand
New Zealand trade unionists
English emigrants to New Zealand
New Liberal Party (New Zealand) MPs
New Zealand MPs for Christchurch electorates
Unsuccessful candidates in the 1908 New Zealand general election
Members of the New Zealand House of Representatives
People from West Northamptonshire District
19th-century New Zealand politicians
Members of district health boards in New Zealand